Nosratabad (also Romanized as Noşratābād; also known as Qarah Qūzī) is a village in Esperan Rural District, in the Central District of Tabriz County, East Azerbaijan Province, Iran. At the 2006 census, its population was 220, in 50 families.

References 

Populated places in Tabriz County